Madama Butterfly (Madame Butterfly) is an opera in three acts (originally two) by Giacomo Puccini, with an Italian libretto by Luigi Illica and Giuseppe Giacosa.

It is based on the short story "Madame Butterfly" (1898) by John Luther Long, which in turn was based on stories told to Long by his sister Jennie Correll and on the semi-autobiographical 1887 French novel Madame Chrysanthème by Pierre Loti. Long's version was dramatized by David Belasco as the one-act play Madame Butterfly: A Tragedy of Japan, which, after premiering in New York in 1900, moved to London, where Puccini saw it in the summer of that year.

The original version of the opera, in two acts, had its premiere on 17 February 1904 at La Scala in Milan. It was poorly received, despite having such notable singers as soprano Rosina Storchio, tenor Giovanni Zenatello and baritone Giuseppe De Luca in lead roles. This was due in part to a late completion by Puccini, which gave inadequate time for rehearsals. Puccini revised the opera, splitting the second act in two, with the Humming Chorus as a bridge to what became Act III, and making other changes. Success ensued, starting with the first performance on 28 May 1904 in Brescia.

Versions 

Puccini wrote five versions of the opera. The original two-act version, which was presented at the world premiere at La Scala on 17 February 1904, was withdrawn after the disastrous premiere. Puccini then substantially rewrote it, this time in three acts. This second version was performed on 28 May 1904 in Brescia, where it was a great success, with Solomiya Krushelnytska as Cio-Cio-san. It was this second version that premiered in the United States in 1906, first in Washington, D.C., in October, and then in New York in November, performed by Henry Savage's New English Opera Company (so named because it performed in English-language translations).

In 1906, Puccini wrote a third version, which was performed at the Metropolitan Opera in New York on 11 February 1907. Later that year, Puccini made several changes in the orchestral and vocal scores, and this became the fourth version, which was performed in Paris.

Again in 1907, Puccini made his final revisions to the opera in a fifth version, which has become known as the "Standard Version" and is the one which is most often performed around the world. However, the original 1904 version is occasionally performed, such as for the opening of La Scala's season on 7 December 2016, with Riccardo Chailly conducting.

Performance history
Premieres of versions of Madama Butterfly in major opera houses throughout the world include the Teatro de la Opera de Buenos Aires on 2 July 1904, under Arturo Toscanini, this being the first performance in the world outside Italy. Its first performance in Britain was in London on 10 July 1905 at the Royal Opera House, Covent Garden, while the first US performance was presented in English on 15 October 1906, in Washington, D.C., at the Columbia Theater. The first performance in New York took place on 12 November of the same year at the Garden Theatre. The Metropolitan Opera first performed the opera on 11 February 1907 under the supervision of the composer with Geraldine Farrar as Cio-Cio-San, Enrico Caruso as Pinkerton, Louise Homer as Suzuki, Antonio Scotti as Sharpless, with Arturo Vigna conducting; Farrar would sing 95 performances as Cio-Cio-San at the Met between 1907 and her retirement in 1922. Madama Butterfly has since been heard virtually every season at the Met except for a hiatus during World War II from 1942 through 1945 due to the hostilities between the United States and Japan. The first Australian performance was presented at the Theatre Royal in Sydney on 26 March 1910, starring Amy Eliza Castles.

Between 1915 and 1920, Japan's best-known opera singer Tamaki Miura won international fame for her performances as Cio-Cio-San. A memorial to this singer, along with one to Puccini, can be found in the Glover Garden in the port city of Nagasaki, where the opera is set.

Roles

Synopsis

Act 1

In 1904, a U.S. naval officer named Pinkerton rents a house on a hill in Nagasaki, Japan, for himself and his soon-to-be wife, "Butterfly". She is a 15-year-old Japanese girl whom he is marrying for convenience, and he intends to leave her once he finds a proper American wife, since Japanese divorce laws are very lax. The wedding is to take place at the house. Butterfly had been so excited to marry an American that she had earlier secretly converted to Christianity. After the wedding ceremony, her uninvited uncle, a bonze, who has found out about her conversion, comes to the house, curses her and orders all the guests to leave, which they do while renouncing her. Pinkerton and Butterfly sing a love duet and prepare to spend their first night together.

Act 2 
Three years later, Butterfly is still waiting for Pinkerton to return, as he had left shortly after their wedding. Her maid Suzuki keeps trying to convince her that he is not coming back, but Butterfly will not listen to her. Goro, the marriage broker who arranged her marriage, keeps trying to marry her off again, but she does not listen to him either. The American consul, Sharpless, comes to the house with a letter which he has received from Pinkerton which asks him to break some news to Butterfly: that Pinkerton is coming back to Japan, but Sharpless cannot bring himself to finish it because Butterfly becomes very excited to hear that Pinkerton is coming back. Sharpless asks Butterfly what she would do if Pinkerton were not to return. She then reveals that she gave birth to Pinkerton's son after he had left and asks Sharpless to tell him.

From the hill house, Butterfly sees Pinkerton's ship arriving in the harbour. She and Suzuki prepare for his arrival, and then they wait. Suzuki and the child fall asleep, but Butterfly stays up all night waiting for him to arrive.

Act 3 
Suzuki wakes up in the morning and Butterfly finally falls asleep. Sharpless and Pinkerton arrive at the house, along with Pinkerton's new American wife, Kate. They have come because Kate has agreed to raise the child. But, as Pinkerton sees how Butterfly has decorated the house for his return, he realizes he has made a huge mistake. He admits that he is a coward and cannot face her, leaving Suzuki, Sharpless, and Kate to break the news to Butterfly. Agreeing to give up her child if Pinkerton comes himself to see her, she then prays to statues of her ancestral gods, says goodbye to her son, and blindfolds him. She places a small American flag in his hands and goes behind a screen, killing herself with her father's seppuku knife. Pinkerton rushes in, but he is too late, and Butterfly dies.

Synopsis (musical numbers) 
This is a synopsis of the standard version of the opera, with its arias, duets, trios, choruses, etc. The synopsis is organized into the 34 tracks that constitute most recordings.

Act 1 
1. A short orchestral prelude with a busy, fugal opening theme, followed by a second theme of more overtly Japanese character, leads straight into the opening scene.

2. E soffitto e pareti ("And ceiling and walls"). Pinkerton and Goro are inspecting a small house which sits on a hill and overlooks the bay. Goro has found the house for Pinkerton and his bride, and is showing him the house, with its sliding doors and small garden. The butler, the cook and the bride's maid, Suzuki, enter the garden and are introduced to Pinkerton. After they leave, Goro tells Pinkerton that everything is now ready and that his intended bride, Butterfly, will arrive soon, as will the American consul, the marriage registrar and all the bride's relatives, except her uncle. Her uncle is a priest and refuses to attend the wedding ceremony. Sharpless, the American consul, has climbed up the hill from the city. He enters the garden, greets Pinkerton and Goro, and admires the view that overlooks Nagasaki's harbor and the sea. Pinkerton tells Sharpless that he has just purchased the little house for 999 years, with the right every month to cancel the agreement. Pinkerton explains that, in Japan, the law is very loose.

3. Dovunque al mondo ("Throughout the world"). As the orchestra plays the opening flourish to "The Star-Spangled Banner" (a musical theme which will characterize Pinkerton throughout the opera), Pinkerton tells Sharpless that, throughout the world, the Yankee wanderer is not satisfied until he captures the flowers of every shore and the love of every beautiful woman. "So I am marrying in the Japanese style: for 999 years, but with the right to cancel the marriage each month". Sharpless is critical of Pinkerton's beliefs, but they stand and agree, "America forever". Pinkerton tells Goro to bring Butterfly to him. When Goro leaves, Sharpless asks Pinkerton if he is really in love.

4. Amore o grillo ("Love or fancy"). Pinkerton admits to Sharpless that he does not know whether he is really in love or just infatuated, but he is bewitched with Butterfly's innocence, charm and beauty; she is like a butterfly fluttering around and then landing with silent grace, so beautiful "that I must have her, even though I injure her butterfly wings". Sharpless tells Pinkerton that he heard Butterfly speak, when she visited the consulate, and he asks Pinkerton not to pluck off her delicate wings. However, Pinkerton tells Sharpless that he will do "no great harm, even if Butterfly falls in love." Sharpless takes his glass of whisky and offers a toast to Pinkerton's family at home, to which Pinkerton adds, "and to the day when I will have a real wedding and marry a real American bride." Goro re-enters to tell Pinkerton and Sharpless that Butterfly's friends are coming.

5. Ancora un passo ("One step more"). Butterfly can be heard guiding her friends to the top of the hill, jubilantly telling them that "Over land and sea, there floats the joyful breath of spring. I am the happiest girl in Japan, or rather in the world." Butterfly and her friends enter the garden. She recognizes Pinkerton and points him out to her friends, and all bow down before him.

6. Gran ventura ("May good fortune attend you"). Butterfly greets Pinkerton, who asks about her difficult climb up the hill. Butterfly says that, for a happy bride, the wait is even more difficult. Pinkerton thanks her for the compliment but cuts her off as she continues to compliment him further. Butterfly tells Pinkerton and Sharpless that her family is from Nagasaki and was once very wealthy.

7. L'Imperial Commissario ("The Imperial Commissioner"). Goro announces the arrival of both the Grand Commissioner and the Registrar of marriages. Butterfly greets her relatives, who have arrived for the wedding. Pinkerton laughs at the sight and whispers to Sharpless, "This is a farce: all these will be my new relatives for only a month." Sharpless tells him that, even though he considers the marriage contract a farce, she considers it very real. Meanwhile, Butterfly tells her relatives how much she loves Pinkerton. One of her cousins says that Goro first offered Pinkerton to her, but she refused. Butterfly's relatives say that he is like a king, so rich and so handsome, and then, at a sign from Butterfly, all her friends and relatives bow to Pinkerton and walk out to the garden. Pinkerton takes Butterfly's hand and leads her into the house.

8. Vieni, amor mio! ("Come, my love!"). From her sleeve, Butterfly brings out to show Pinkerton all of her treasures, which include only a few handkerchiefs, a mirror, a sash, and other trinkets. Then she shows him a long, narrow case, which she tells him holds her only sacred treasure, but she cannot open it, because there are too many people around. Goro whispers to Pinkerton that the case contains a "gift" from the Mikado to Butterfly's father, inviting him to commit seppuku. Butterfly continues to show Pinkerton her other little treasures, including several little statues: "They are the spirits of my ancestors."

9. Ieri son salita tutta sola ("Yesterday, I went all alone"). Butterfly tells Pinkerton that yesterday, in secret and without telling her uncle, who is a Buddhist priest, the Bonze, she went to the consulate, where she abandoned her ancestral religion and converted to Pinkerton's religion. "I am following my destiny and, full of humility, bow to Mr. Pinkerton's God."

10. Tutti zitti ("Quiet everyone"). Everything is ready, and Goro tells everyone to be quiet. The Commissioner conducts the brief ceremony and witnesses Pinkerton and Butterfly sign the official papers.

11. Madama Butterfly. The wedding celebration begins, and everyone wishes happiness to the new couple. After a short while, Sharpless pleads with Pinkerton not to be cruel, and he leaves with the Commissioner and the Registrar. Pinkerton, Butterfly and their guests continue the celebration with many toasts.

12. Cio-Cio-san!. The toasts are interrupted by an angry voice offstage, saying "Cio-Cio-San! Cio-Cio-San! You are damned." Butterfly's uncle, the Bonze, has discovered that Butterfly has renounced her ancestral religion, and he has arrived to deliver his curse. He stands over Butterfly, shouting his curses at her, when Pinkerton intervenes to stop him. The Bonze is shocked at the American, and he orders all the guests to leave with him, saying to Butterfly, "You have renounced us, and we renounce you." All the guests shout their renunciation as they rush away. The night is falling. Butterfly is weeping. Pinkerton consoles her.

13. Bimba, Bimba, non piangere ("Sweetheart, sweetheart, do not weep"). (This begins the famous long love duet, which ends act 1.) Pinkerton tells Butterfly that "All your relatives and all the priests in Japan are not worth the tears from your loving, beautiful eyes." Butterfly smiles through her tears, "You mean that? I will not cry any more. And I do not worry about their curses, because your words sound so sweet." They hear Suzuki offstage, saying her evening prayers.

13A. Viene la sera ("Night is falling"). (The long duet continues.) Pinkerton tells Butterfly that the "Night is falling", and Butterfly answers that "with it comes darkness and peace." Pinkerton claps his hands, and the three servants enter and close up the house. Then Suzuki helps Butterfly dress for her wedding night. Pinkerton watches Butterfly, as she watches him, but her happiness is tempered, as "still the angry voice curses me. Butterfly is renounced – renounced but happy".

14. Bimba dagli occhi ("Sweetheart, with eyes..."). (The long duet continues.) Pinkerton admires the beautiful Butterfly and tells her, "you have not yet told me that you love me." Butterfly replies that she does not want to say the words, "for fear of dying at hearing them!" She tells him that now she is happy.

15. Vogliatemi bene ("Love me, please."). (The long duet concludes.) Butterfly pleads with Pinkerton to "Love me, please." She asks whether it is true that, in foreign lands, a man will catch a butterfly and pin its wings to a table. Pinkerton admits that it is true but explains, "Do you know why? So that she will not fly away." He embraces her and says, "I have caught you. You are mine." She replies, "Yes, for life."

Act 2 
16. E Izaghi ed Izanami ("And Izanagi and Izanami"). As the curtain opens, three years have passed. Suzuki kneels in front of a Buddha, praying that Butterfly will stop crying. Butterfly hears and tells her that the Japanese gods are fat and lazy, and that the American God will answer quickly, if only He knows where they are living. Suzuki tells Butterfly that their money has almost run out and, if Pinkerton does not return quickly, they will suffer in a bad way. Butterfly assures Suzuki that Pinkerton will return, because he took care to arrange for the consul to pay the rent and to fit the house with locks to keep out the mosquitoes, relatives and troubles. Suzuki tells Butterfly that foreign husbands never return to their Japanese wives, but Butterfly replies furiously that Pinkerton had assured her, on the last morning they were together, "Oh, Butterfly, my little wife, I shall return with the roses, when the earth is full of joy, when the robin makes his nest." Suzuki begins quietly to weep.

17. Un bel dì, vedremo ("One fine day we shall see"). In this, the opera's most famous aria (and one of the most popular works in the soprano repertoire), Butterfly says that, "one fine day", they will see a puff of smoke on the far horizon. Then a ship will appear and enter the harbor. She will not go down to meet him but will wait on the hill for him to come. After a long time, she will see in the far distance a man beginning the walk out of the city and up the hill. When he arrives, he will call "Butterfly" from a distance, but she will not answer, partly for fun and partly not to die from the excitement of the first meeting. Then he will speak the names he used to call her: "Little one. Dear wife. Orange blossom." Butterfly promises Suzuki that this will happen. Suzuki departs, as Sharpless and Goro arrive in the garden.

18. C'e. Entrate. ("She is there. Go in."). Sharpless greets her, "Excuse me, Madam Butterfly." Without looking to see who is speaking, Butterfly corrects him, "Madam Pinkerton, please." As she turns and sees that it is Sharpless who has spoken, she exclaims in happiness, "My very dear consul. Welcome to this American home." Sharpless draws a letter from his pocket and tells her, "Benjamin Franklin Pinkerton has written to me." Sharpless tells her that Pinkerton is perfectly well, and she says, "I am the happiest woman in Japan." Butterfly asks him, "When do the robins make their nests in America?" The question confuses Sharpless, so Butterfly explains that Pinkerton promised to return to her "when the robin builds his nest again." She says that, in Japan, the robin has already built his nest three times, and she asks if "over there he nests less frequently." Sharpless, mortified, tells her that he does not know because he has not studied ornithology. At this, Butterfly hears Goro laugh, and she whispers to Sharpless that Goro is a bad man. She tells him that, after Pinkerton left, Goro came to her many times "with presents to palm off this or that husband on me." She says that Goro now wants her to agree to marry the wealthy man Yamadori, who then is arriving with his entourage to a musical accompaniment that quotes the same Japanese folk tune (Miyasan) that Gilbert and Sullivan set as "Mi-ya sama" in The Mikado.

19. Yamadori, ancor le pene ("Yamadori, are you not yet…"). Butterfly sees Yamadori and asks him if he is not going to give up pursuing her, because "You have already had many different wives." Yamadori admits that he married all of them, but says that he divorced them too. In the meantime, Sharpless gives up trying to read Pinkerton's letter to Butterfly, and he puts the letter back in his pocket. Goro tells Sharpless that Butterfly thinks that she is still married. Butterfly hears this and says, "I do not  I am; I am." When Goro tries to tell her about the Japanese law of marriage, Butterfly interrupts and tells him that the Japanese law is not the law of her country, the United States. She tells Goro that she understands how easy divorce is under Japanese law, "but in America, you cannot do that." She turns sharply and asks Sharpless, "Am I correct?" Sharpless is embarrassed and must admit that she is correct. Butterfly turns triumphantly to Suzuki and asks that she serve tea. Yamadori, Sharpless and Goro quietly discuss Butterfly's blindness. Goro whispers that Pinkerton's ship is expected to arrive soon, and Sharpless explains that Pinkerton is too embarrassed to meet Butterfly and has asked Sharpless to handle it. Yamadori, offended, departs with his grand entourage and Goro. Sharpless remains, sits next to Butterfly, and takes the letter out of his pocket once more.

20. Ora a noi. ("Now for us."). Sharpless begins to read Pinkerton's letter to Butterfly: "My friend, will you find that lovely flower of a girl…" Butterfly cannot control her happiness, as he continues, "since that happy times, three years have passed, and Butterfly perhaps does not remember me anymore." Butterfly looks at Suzuki and says, "I do not remember him? Suzuki, you tell him!" Sharpless continues, "If she still loves me, if she awaits me, I place myself in your hands so that you may carefully and considerately prepare her …" Butterfly exclaims, "He is coming! When? Soon! Soon!" Sharpless cannot bear to continue. He puts the letter away, muttering to himself, "that devil Pinkerton!" Sharpless asks her gently, "Butterfly, what would you do if he never returned?" Butterfly is shocked.

21. Due cose potrei far ("Two things I could do"). Butterfly cries that, if Pinkerton never returned, she would go back to entertaining people with her songs, or, better, die. Sharpless pleads with her to accept the rich offer from Yamadori. Butterfly is upset with Sharpless and instructs Suzuki to show him out. As he begins to leave, Butterfly stops him, apologizes for her anger, and explains that his questions have hurt her "so very, very much!" Then she goes into another room and returns, bringing with her the blonde-haired two-year-old boy who is her constant reminder of her American husband.

22. Ah! M'ha scordata? ("Ah! He has forgotten me?"). Butterfly shows Sharpless her child, and Sharpless asks if Pinkerton knows. Butterfly replies, "No. The child was born when he was away in his big country." She asks Sharpless to write and tell him that his son waits for him. "And then we shall see if he does not hurry over land and sea!" Butterfly kneels in front of her son and asks him, "Do you know that that gentleman had dared to think that your mother would take you in her arms and walk to town, through the wind and rain, to earn your bread and clothes. And she would stretch out her arms to the pitying crowd, crying ‘Listen! Listen to my sad song, For an unhappy mother, your charity. Take pity! And Butterfly – oh, horrible destiny – will dance for you! And as she used to do, the Geisha will sing for you. And her joyful, happy song will end in a sob!" She kneels in front of Sharpless and says that she will never do that, "that trade which leads to dishonor. Death! Death! Never more to dance! Rather would I cut short my life! Ah! Death!"

23. Io scendo al piano. ("I will go now.") Sharpless finally says, "I will go now." Butterfly gives him her hand and this her child's. Sharpless asks the child his name, and Butterfly answers for him, "Today my name is Sorrow. But write and tell Daddy that, the day he returns, my name will be Joy." Sharpless promises to tell Pinkerton. Offstage, Suzuki can be heard shouting, "Snake. Damned toad!" Suzuki enters, pulling Goro with her, and she tells Butterfly, "He buzzes around, the snake. Every day he tells the four winds that no one knows who is the child's father!" Goro explains that, in America, when a child is born with a curse, he will always be rejected by everyone. In a rage, Butterfly runs to the shrine, seizes the dagger and threatens to stab him, "You are lying! You are lying! Say that again, and I will kill you!" Goro flees. Suzuki takes the child to the other room. Butterfly replaces the dagger, goes to her son and says, "You will see, my darling, my Sorrow. You will see, your savior will take us far, far away to his land."

24. Il cannone del porto! ("The cannon at the harbor!", often known as The Flower Duet). Just then a cannon shot is heard. Suzuki and Butterfly watch from the hill as the ship enters the harbor and drops anchor. Then Butterfly sees that the ship is the Abraham Lincoln, and she tells Suzuki, "They were all lying! All of them! I alone knew. Only I, who love him." She continues, "My love, my faith, triumphs completely! He has returned, and he loves me!" She tells Suzuki to prepare a fragrant bath and asks how long she will have to wait for him. "An hour? Two hours, perhaps? The house must be filled with flowers. Everywhere. As the night is full of stars!" Butterfly tells Suzuki to gather all the flowers.

25. Tutti i fior? ("All the flowers?"). Suzuki asks, "All the flowers?" Butterfly says yes, all the flowers from all the bushes and plants and trees. "I want the whole fragrance of Spring in here." They continue to gather flowers and place them everywhere.

26. Or vienmi ad adornar ("Now come to adorn me"). Finally, Butterfly sits at her dressing table and tells Suzuki, "Now, come and adorn me. No, first bring me the child." She puts a touch of rouge on her own and on her child's cheeks and then, as Suzuki does her hair, asks her, "What will they say? My uncle, the priest? All so happy at my misery! And Yamadori, with his pursuit? Ridiculed, disgraced, made foolish, the hateful things!" Butterfly dons the same dress that she wore as a bride, while Suzuki dresses her child. Butterfly tells Suzuki that she wants Pinkerton to see her dressed as she was on the first day "and a red poppy in my hair."

27. Coro a bocca chiusa ("Humming Chorus"). As the off-stage chorus hums a wordless, melancholy tune, Butterfly, her child and Suzuki begin the long wait for Pinkerton to come. Night falls. Suzuki and the baby are soon asleep, but Butterfly keeps her vigil.

There is no intermission between acts 2 and 3. The action continues without interruption as the "Humming Chorus" ends and morning light appears.

Act 3 
28. Oh eh! Oh eh! ("Heave-ho! Heave-ho!"). Suzuki and the baby are asleep, but Butterfly remains standing and waiting. Distant voices are heard from the bay. Sailors are singing, "Heave-ho! Heave-ho!" The sun rises and fills Butterfly's house with light.

29. Già il sole! ("The Sun's come up!"). Suzuki awakes and is very sad. Butterfly tells her that "He will come." Then she carries her sleeping child into the other room and tells him to sleep, while she too falls asleep. Suzuki waits in the front room and hears a knock at the door. Pinkerton and Sharpless have arrived, but Pinkerton tells Suzuki not to wake Butterfly and asks how Butterfly knew that he had arrived. Suzuki tells him that, for the last three years, Butterfly has studied every ship that entered the port. Sharpless tells Pinkerton, "Did I not tell you so?" Suzuki sees a strange woman in the garden, learns from Sharpless that she is Pinkerton's American wife and collapses to her knees in shock.

30. Io so che alle sue pene ("I know that her pain"). While Pinkerton looks at the flowers, the picture of himself and the room that has remained unchanged for three years, Sharpless tells Suzuki that they can do nothing for Butterfly but that they must help her child. Sharpless tells her that Pinkerton's new wife, Kate, wants to care for the child. Suzuki goes into the garden to meet Pinkerton's new wife, while Sharpless reminds Pinkerton, "I told you, did I not? Do you remember? When she gave you her hand: 'Take care', I said, 'she believes in you'. She has been waiting for you." Pinkerton admits his wrong and leaves Sharpless to tell Butterfly the shameful news.

31. Addio, fiorito asil ("Farewell, flowery refuge"). Pinkerton says "Farewell, flowery refuge of happiness and of love, her gentle face will always haunt me, torturing me endlessly." He admits that he is a coward and cannot face her, and quickly leaves as Suzuki and Kate enter from the garden. Kate is telling Suzuki to assure Butterfly that Kate will look after her child like her own son.

32. Suzuki! Suzuki! ("Suzuki! Suzuki!"). From offstage, Butterfly calls for Suzuki and then enters the room. As she enters, Kate retreats to the garden, so that she will not be seen. She asks Suzuki why she is crying, and then she sees Sharpless and the woman in the garden. She tells Suzuki, "Suzuki, you are so kind. Do not cry. You love me so much. Tell me softly, just 'yes' or 'no' … Is he alive?" When Suzuki answers, "yes", Butterfly understands that Pinkerton is not coming for her and that Kate is his new wife. Butterfly realizes that she must give up her son, and Kate asks her forgiveness. Finally, Butterfly tells Kate, "I will give my child to her only if he comes himself. In half an hour, come up the hill again." Suzuki escorts Kate and Sharpless out, and Butterfly falls weeping.

33. Come una mosca ("Like a little fly"). Butterfly stands, sees Suzuki and tells her to close up the house, because it is too light and springlike. Then she orders her to go to the other room where the child is playing. Butterfly then kneels before the statue of Buddha and prays to her ancestral gods. She rises, takes down her father's knife, kisses the blade, and reads the inscription.

34. Con onor muore ("To die with honor"). Butterfly reads the inscription on her father's knife: "Who cannot live with honor must die with honor."

35. Tu? Tu? Piccolo iddio! ("You? You? My little god!"). Butterfly's child enters, but Suzuki does not. Butterfly tells her child not to feel sorrow for his mother's desertion but to keep a faint memory of his mother's face. She bids him farewell, seats him on the floor and blindfolds him gently. She gives him a miniature American flag to wave in greeting to his father, which he does, blindfolded, throughout the following action. Butterfly takes the knife and walks behind the screen. The knife clatters to the floor as Butterfly staggers from behind the screen with a scarf around her neck. She kisses her child and collapses. From outside, Pinkerton cries, "Butterfly!" and rushes in – but it is too late: Butterfly is dead.

Instrumentation
Madama Butterfly is scored for three flutes (the third doubling piccolo); two oboes, one English horn; two clarinets in B-flat; one bass clarinet in B-flat, two bassoons; four French horns in F; three trumpets in F; three tenor trombones; one bass trombone; a percussion section with timpani, cymbals, one triangle, one snare drum, one bass drum, bells, one tam-tam, one Japanese gong, and one set of 4 "Japanese Bells"; one keyboard glockenspiel; one onstage "little bell"; onstage tubular bells; one onstage viola d'amore; onstage bird whistles; one onstage tam-tam; one onstage bass tam-tam; a harp; and strings.

Reception 
In its initial form, the opera was not well received. The premier in Milan was a fiasco, as Puccini's sister, Ramelde, wrote in a letter to her husband:

It is very difficult to judge why the version which premiered in Milan left the audience in such disappointment, since it is not that different from the version that triumphed in Brescia just a few months later.

Madama Butterfly has been criticized by some American intellectuals for orientalism. Despite these opinions, Madama Butterfly has been successfully performed in Japan in various adaptions from 1914, Puccini's music going relatively unnoticed in respect to the racy libretto.

Today Madama Butterfly is the sixth most performed opera in the world and considered a masterpiece, with Puccini's orchestration praised as limpid, fluent and refined.  is the most famous aria from Madama Butterfly and one of the most recognizable soprano arias in the world of opera.

Recordings

Adaptations 

 1915: A silent film version was directed by Sidney Olcott and starred Mary Pickford.
 1919: A silent (tinted) film version (titled Harakiri) directed by Fritz Lang and starring Paul Biensfeldt, Lil Dagover, Georg John and Niels Prien.
 1922: A silent color film, The Toll of the Sea, based on the opera/play was released. This movie, which starred Anna May Wong in her first leading role, moved the storyline to China. It was the second two-color Technicolor motion picture ever released and the first film made using Technicolor Process 2.
 1931: Concise Chōchō-san by the Takarazuka Revue
 1932: Madame Butterfly, a non-singing drama (with ample portions of Puccini's score in the musical underscoring) made by Paramount starring Sylvia Sidney and Cary Grant in black & white.
 1940:  "Madame Butterfly's Illusion", a 12-minute Japanese silhouette animation film.
 1954: Madame Butterfly, a screen adaptation of the opera, directed by Carmine Gallone jointly produced by Italy's Cineriz and Japan's Toho. The film was shot in Technicolor at Cinecittà in Rome, Italy. Starring Japanese actress Kaoru Yachigusa as Cio-Cio San and Italian tenor Nicola Filacuridi as Pinkerton, and with Japanese actors and Italian actors, dubbed by Italian opera singers.
 1965: Sao Krua Fah, a 16 mm Thai film starred by Mitr Chaibancha and Pisamai Wilaisak. 
 1974: Madama Butterfly, a German television adaptation of the opera starring Mirella Freni and Plácido Domingo, directed by Jean-Pierre Ponnelle.
 1988: The play M. Butterfly by David Henry Hwang is partially based on Madama Butterfly as well as the story of French diplomat Bernard Boursicot and the Beijing opera singer Shi Pei Pu.
 1989: The West End and Broadway musical Miss Saigon was, in part, based on Madama Butterfly. The story was moved to Vietnam and Thailand and set against the backdrop of the Vietnam War and the Fall of Saigon, but the central themes are largely unchanged.
 1995: Frédéric Mitterrand directed a film version of the opera, Madame Butterfly, in Tunisia, North Africa, starring Richard Troxell and Chinese singer Ying Huang in the lead roles.
 1995: Australian choreographer Stanton Welch created a ballet, inspired by the opera, for The Australian Ballet.
 1996: The album Pinkerton by the rock band Weezer was based loosely on the opera.
 2004: On the 100th anniversary of Madama Butterfly, Shigeaki Saegusa composed Jr. Butterfly to a libretto by Masahiko Shimada.
 2011: Cho cho san, Japanese novel, and TV drama series based on the novel, written by Shinichi Ichikawa. Based on the original opera, the story depicts the sorrowful love and turbulent life of a samurai's daughter who loses her parents at a young age and becomes the apprentice of a geisha, set in the early Meiji era in Nagasaki, Japan. Starring Japanese actress Aoi Miyazaki as Cho Ito (Cho cho san).
 2013: Cho Cho, musical drama by Daniel Keene, music by Cheng Jin, set in 1930s Shanghai.

References

Sources

Further reading
 Burke-Gaffney, Brian, Starcrossed: A Biography of Madame Butterfly, EastBridge, 2004 .
 Groos, Arthur, "Madame Butterfly: The Story", Cambridge Opera Journal, vol. 3, no. 2 (July 1991)
 Melitz, Leo, The Opera Goer's Complete Guide, 1921 version, source of the plot.
 Mezzanotte, Riccardo (ed.), The Simon & Schuster Book of the Opera: A Complete Reference Guide – 1597 to the Present, New York: Simon and Schuster, 1977. .
 Osborne, Charles, The Complete Operas of Puccini, New York: Da Capo Press, 1983.
 Weaver, William, Simonetta Puccini, (eds.), The Puccini Companion, New York: W. W. Norton, 1994. .

External links

 
 Detailed synopsis
 New York City Opera Project: Madama Butterfly – Columbia University
 "Madame Butterfly Turns 100; A Century Ago, Puccini's Tragic Heroine First Took the Stage". NPR
 Libretto, Stanford University
 John Luther Long, Madame Butterfly, the original book
 Full piano vocal score, William and Gayle Cook Music Library, Indiana University School of Music
 , Renata Tebaldi sings "Un bel dì, vedremo"

1904 operas
Fiction set in 1904
Operas set in the 20th century
Italian-language operas
Nagasaki in fiction
Japan in non-Japanese culture
Opera world premieres at La Scala
Operas based on novels
Operas based on plays
Operas by Giacomo Puccini
Operas set in Japan
Operas
Fiction about suicide
Operas adapted into films
Fiction about interracial romance